Semih is a Turkish given name for males, meaning Generous and also Worthy and Great.  Semiha is the female form. People named Semih include:

 Semih Aydilek, Turkish footballer
 Semih Çalışkan (born 1986), Turkish novelist
 Semih Deniz (born 1989), Turkish Paralympian middle distance runner
 Semih Erden, Turkish basketball player
 Semih Kaplanoğlu, Turkish playwright, film director and producer
 Semih Kaya, Turkish footballer
 Semih Özmert, Turkish judge
 Semih Saygıner, Turkish carom billiards player
 Semih Şentürk, Turkish footballer
 Semih Tezcan, Turkish scientist
 Semih Tufan Gülaltay, Turkish criminal
 Semih Yağcı, Turkish weightlifter
 Semih Sevimli, Turkish game designer, Entrepreneur

Turkish masculine given names